Amphodia is a monotypic moth genus of the family Noctuidae. Its only species, Amphodia prolata, is found in Suriname. Both the genus and species were first described by Heinrich Benno Möschler in 1880.

References

Acontiinae
Noctuoidea genera
Taxa named by Heinrich Benno Möschler
Monotypic moth genera